The 2013–14 season was the 66th season in the existence of FC Steaua București and the club's 66th consecutive season in the top flight of Romanian football. In addition to the domestic league, Steaua București participated in this season's edition of the Cupa României, the Supercupa României and the UEFA Champions League.

Season notes
During the season Alexandru Aldea changed his shirt number 18 with the number 31.

Alexandru Bourceanu was Steaua captain until was transferred to Trabzonspor, from round 20 to final season captain was Mihai Pintilii.

Players

First-team squad

Youth players with first-team appearances

Transfers

In

Out

Statistics

Goalscorers
Last updated on 20 May 2014 (UTC)

Competitions

Supercupa României

Results

Liga I

League table

Results summary

Results by round

Points by opponent

Matches

Cupa României

Results

UEFA Champions League

Qualifying rounds

Second qualifying round

Third qualifying round

Play-off round

Group stage

Results

Non competitive matches

See also

 2013–14 Cupa României
 2013–14 Liga I
 2013–14 UEFA Champions League

Notes and references

FC Steaua București seasons
Steaua Bucuresti season
Steaua Bucuresti
Romanian football championship-winning seasons